The 2020 Food City 300 was a NASCAR Xfinity Series race held on September 18, 2020. It was contested over 300 laps on the  short track. It was the twenty-sixth race of the 2020 NASCAR Xfinity Series season. Stewart-Haas Racing driver Chase Briscoe collected his seventh win of the season.

Report

Background 

The Bristol Motor Speedway, formerly known as Bristol International Raceway and Bristol Raceway, is a NASCAR short track venue located in Bristol, Tennessee. Constructed in 1960, it held its first NASCAR race on July 30, 1961. Despite its short length, Bristol is among the most popular tracks on the NASCAR schedule because of its distinct features, which include extraordinarily steep banking, an all concrete surface, two pit roads, and stadium-like seating. It has also been named one of the loudest NASCAR tracks.

Entry list 

 (R) denotes rookie driver.
 (i) denotes driver who is ineligible for series driver points.

Qualifying 
Justin Allgaier was awarded the pole based on competition based formula.

Qualifying results

Race

Race results

Stage Results 
Stage One
Laps: 85

Stage Two
Laps: 85

Final Stage Results 

Laps: 130

Race statistics 

 Lead changes: 10 among 5 different drivers
 Cautions/Laps: 7 for 45
 Time of race: 1 hour, 55 minutes, and 39 seconds
 Average speed:

References 

NASCAR races at Bristol Motor Speedway
2020 in sports in Tennessee
Food City 300
2020 NASCAR Xfinity Series